Journey to the Center of the Earth (also promoted as Journey to the Center of the Earth 3-D or Journey 3D) is a 2008 American 3D science fantasy action-adventure film directed by Eric Brevig and starring Brendan Fraser in the main role, Josh Hutcherson, Anita Briem and Seth Meyers. Produced by New Line Cinema, it is an adaptation of Jules Verne's 1864 novel (which had previously been adapted multiple times, most notably in the 1959 film of the same name), and was released in 3D theaters by Warner Bros. Pictures on July 11, 2008.

The film also introduced the 4DX movie format, featuring "4D" motion effects in a specially designed cinema in Seoul, South Korea, using tilting seats to convey motion, wind, sprays of water and sharp air, probe lights to mimic lightning, fog, scents, and other theatrical special effects.

The film received mixed reviews from critics and earned $244.2 million against a $60 million budget. A sequel, Journey 2: The Mysterious Island, was released on February 10, 2012 with only Hutcherson returning on the main cast.

Plot
In 2007, Trevor Anderson is a Bostonian volcanologist whose 13-year-old nephew, Sean, is supposed to spend ten days with him. Trevor learns at work that his brother's lab is being shut down because of a lack of funding. Trevor has forgotten that Sean is coming until he receives several messages from Sean's mother Elizabeth. When Sean's mother drops him off, she leaves Trevor with a box of items that belonged to Max, Trevor's brother and Sean's father, who disappeared 10 years before. Sean suddenly takes interest in what Trevor has to say after he tells him about his father, whom he never really had a chance to know.  In the box, Trevor discovers the novel Journey to the Center of the Earth by Jules Verne. Inside the book Trevor finds notes written by his late brother. Trevor goes to his laboratory to find out more about the notes. There he realizes that he must go to Iceland to investigate for himself.

He intends to send Sean back to his mother, but relents at Sean's protest and brings Sean to Iceland with him.  They start by looking for another volcanologist. When they get to that scientist's institution, they meet his daughter Hannah, who informs them he is dead. She also tells them that both her father and Max believed that Jules Verne's books were factual accounts. However she offers to help them climb up to the instrument that has suddenly started sending data again. While hiking the mountain, a lightning storm forces the three into a cave. The cave entrance collapses, trapping them, so they have no alternative but to go deeper in the cave, which turns out to be an abandoned mine.

Trevor, Sean, and Hannah investigate farther into the mine until they fall into a deep hole, taking them to the "Center of the Earth". They all continue until they discover a cave-dwelling that Max lived in.  Trevor and Sean find Max's old journal. Hannah and Trevor discover Max's dead body and bury him. Trevor reads a message from Max's journal that was written on Sean's 3rd birthday (8.14.97). Trevor continues to read Max's journal until he realizes from his notes that they must quickly leave, as the temperature is steadily rising.

Trevor figures that they must find a geyser that can send them to the surface. They must do this in 48 hours or all of the water to create the geyser will be gone. They also figure that they must get out before the temperature rises past 135 degrees. They start building a raft to cross the underground ocean, and then the two adults become separated from Sean. Sean's guide is now a little glowing bird who has been present since the trio entered the center, and it takes him towards the river. However, he encounters a Giganotosaurus, and Trevor – who desperately is searching for him – saves him. When they arrive at the geyser it is all dried up. All the water is on the other side of the walls.

Trevor uses a flare to ignite the magnesium in the wall and causes a geyser to shoot them through Mount Vesuvius in Italy. When they destroy the home of an Italian man, Sean gives him a diamond that he had found earlier. Trevor sees that he has many more in his backpack, and he uses them to fund his brother's laboratory. Throughout the adventure, Hannah and Trevor gradually become so attached to each other that they share a kiss. On the final day of Sean's visit with Trevor (and now Hannah), he is leaving their new home, which was purchased with some of the diamonds Sean took from the cave, and Trevor hands Sean a book titled "Atlantis", suggesting they could maybe hang out at Sean's during Christmas break.

Cast
 Brendan Fraser as Professor Trevor "Trev" Anderson, a volcanologist, Sean's uncle and Max's brother
 Anita Briem as Hannah Asgeirsson
 Josh Hutcherson as Sean Anderson, Trevor's nephew and Liz & Max's son
 Seth Meyers as Professor Alan Kitzens
 Jean-Michel Pare as Maxwell 'Max' Anderson, Sean's father, Trevor's brother and Liz's husband
 Jane Wheeler as Elizabeth 'Liz' Anderson, Sean's mother and Max's wife.
 Frank Fontaine as Old Man
 Giancarlo Caltabiano as Leonard
 Kaniehtiio Horn as Gum-Chewing Girl
 Garth Gilker as Sigurbjorn Asgeirsson

Production

Development and filming
In September 2001, Walden Media announced that Eric Brevig was hired and set to direct Journey to the Center of the Earth based on the book of the same name by Jules Verne. Michael D. Weiss, Mark Levin and Jennifer Flackett wrote the script for the film. Beau Flynn and Charlotte Huggins produced the film with the budget of $60 million for release in 2008. In 2003, Brendan Fraser, Anita Briem, Josh Hutcherson, Seth Meyers, Jean-Michel Paré, Jane Wheeler, Giancarlo Caltabiano and Garth Gilker joined the film. Andrew Lockington composed the music for the film. The development and filming of the film was completed in Canada and Iceland in March 2006, followed by principal photography and production which began on April 20. In January 2007, New Line Cinema acquired distribution rights to the film. The film transposes the novel into the present day and is mostly live action, with only the landscape and creatures supplied by computer-generated graphics. The film is projected using Real D Cinema and Dolby 3D.

Josh Hutcherson's character, Sean, is named after the professor and conservation biologist Dr. Sean Anderson.

The computer graphics in the film were produced by the Canadian company Meteor Studios, which declared bankruptcy immediately after having finished work on Journey to the Center of the Earth, leaving its employees and freelancers unpaid after having postponed their paychecks for three months; after a lawsuit and the direct intervention of Brendan Fraser, the former Meteor personnel settled for 70% of what was owed.

Release

Marketing
The first trailer was shown before screenings of Meet the Robinsons, the re-release of The Nightmare Before Christmas and the release of Beowulf, with the Hannah Montana & Miley Cyrus: Best of Both Worlds Concert, and during the 2008 Kids' Choice Awards. Warner Bros. marketed the film like a theme park attraction. However, the studio had to slightly tweak the campaign (including dropping "3D" from the title) when it became clear that the film would be shown in 3-D in far fewer theaters than anticipated.

Theme parks
In May 2009, the film premiered as "Journey to the Center of the Earth 4-D" at Stone Mountain Park in Georgia. It also opened in the motion simulator at Dollywood under the same name on June 12 the same year. It also featured the new 4D Cinema at the Weston Super-Mare Grand Pier in the U.K and was shown in Movieworld on the Gold Coast.

Home media
Journey to the Center of the Earth was released on DVD and Blu-ray on October 28, 2008, in standard 2D format as well as a magenta / green anaglyph. It opened at #2 at the DVD sales chart, selling 843,224 units in the 1st week which translates to $13,238,617 in revenue. As per the latest figures, 1,642,994 DVD units have been sold, bringing in $25,346,260 in revenue. This doesn't include Blu-ray Disc sales / DVD rentals. The 2008 2-disc BD edition of the movie doesn't conform to the – only later established – 3D Blu-ray specifications, which means that this version doesn't take advantage of any dedicated 3D HDTVs, although it can be watched on 3D HDTVs,  as well as on any other TV in anaglyph 3D, by using red-cyan paper glasses (four pairs are included). A 3D Blu-ray version was released on January 17, 2012. Both the "Standard 2D Version" and the 3D BD version, released in 2008 by Roadshow Home Entertainment in Australia, appeared under the title Journey to the Centre of the Earth.

Reception

Critical response
On Rotten Tomatoes, it has an approval rating of 61% based on 158 reviews with an average rating of 6/10. The website's critical consensus reads: "Modern visuals and an old fashioned storyline make this family adventure/comedy a fast-paced, kitschy ride". Metacritic gave the film a 57 out of 100, based on 35 reviews, indicating "mixed or average reviews". Audiences surveyed by CinemaScore gave the film a grade "A−" on scale of A to F.

Roger Ebert of the Chicago Sun-Times gave the film 2 stars out of 4, and wrote: "This is a fairly bad movie, and yet at the same time maybe about as good as it could be. There may not be an 8-year-old alive who would not love it." Peter Travers of Rolling Stone gave it 2.5 out of 4, but warned "Remove a star from the rating if you take this Journey without wearing 3-D glasses. That’s where the real fun comes in." Owen Glieberman of Entertainment Weekly gave it a B- and said "Journey is just the new version of a 1950s comin'-at-ya roller coaster, with a tape measure, trilobite antennae, and giant snapping piranha thrust at the audience."

Box office
Journey to the Center of the Earth grossed $101.7 million in the US and $142.5 million in other territories, for a worldwide total of $242 million.

The film opened at #3 in North America, behind Hellboy II: The Golden Army and Hancock. The film grossed $21,018,141 in 2,811 theaters in its first week of release with an average of $7,477. 57 percent of the opening gross was taken from theaters which showed the film in 3-D. In second weekend it dropped to $12,340,435 and in third to $9,717,217.

Accolades

Sequel

In March 2009, Walden Media announced a sequel film, Journey 2: The Mysterious Island, starring Hutcherson, Dwayne Johnson, Michael Caine, Luis Guzman, and Vanessa Hudgens. Fraser and Briem's characters did not return, and Jane Wheeler was replaced by Kristin Davis. Journey 2 was filmed between November 2010 and February 2011 and was released in February 2012.  Like the first film, the sequel was shot in 3D, and the script is loosely based on a Verne novel –The Mysterious Island.

Journey to the Center of the Earth: 4-D Adventure
Journey to the Center of the Earth 4-D Adventure is a 15-minute 4D film shown at various 4D theatres all over the world. It retells the condensed story of the film with the help of 3D projection and sensory effects, including moving seats, wind, mist and scents. Produced by SimEx-Iwerks, the 4D experience premiered in 2009. Locations included Warner Bros. Movie World (2010–2012), Dollywood (2009–2012), Enchanted Kingdom (2009–), Stone Mountain, and Rainbows End.

References

External links

 
 
 
 
 Journey to the Center of the Earth 3-D Production Notes

2008 films
2008 3D films
2000s fantasy adventure films
2008 science fiction action films
American 3D films
American fantasy adventure films
American science fantasy films
American science fiction films
Icelandic-language films
Films based on Journey to the Center of the Earth
Walden Media films
Films produced by Beau Flynn
Films directed by Eric Brevig
Films scored by Andrew Lockington
Films shot in Iceland
Films shot in Montreal
Films shot in Winnipeg
Films set in Iceland
Films set in Naples
2008 directorial debut films
Giant monster films
Films about dinosaurs
New Line Cinema films
Warner Bros. films
2000s English-language films
2000s American films